The Taff Vale Railway A class was a class of 0-6-2T steam tank locomotives designed by J. Cameron for  mixed traffic work and introduced to the Taff Vale Railway (TVR) in 1914.  The A class was an enlarged version of the TVR O4 class designed by Tom Hurry Riches in 1907. The A class was the last new class of locomotive to be introduced on the TVR, which had introduced its first 0-6-2Ts in 1885 (the M class); and, with a total of 58 built, was numerically the largest class of tank locomotive on the TVR.

, and they were used mainly on passenger trains.

By the time that the TVR amalgamated with the Great Western Railway (GWR) at the start of 1922, only four (TVR nos. 3, 42, 52 and 120) still worked at the original pressure. All 58 passed to British Railways (BR) in 1948, until the introduction of the BR 82xxx 2-6-2Ts in the mid-1950s, these engines were widely used on passenger workings in the South Wales Valleys.

After withdrawal, several were employed as Works Pilots in Swindon before being broken up. The first loco withdrawn was 344 in November 1952 from Cardiff Cathays shed. The last seven locos 370, 373, 381, 383, 390, 398 and 402 were withdrawn together in August 1957 from Abercynon shed. None are preserved.

Builders and numbering
The locomotives were built in several batches by Hawthorn Leslie, Nasmyth, Wilson and Company, Vulcan Foundry and North British Locomotive Company.  Their initial GWR numbers were in the ranges 335–408 (for locos working at a boiler pressure of ) and 438–441 (pressure ), but they were not consecutive and were intermingled with other classes. Those with numbers above 399 were renumbered between 303 and 322 during 1947–50.

Originally, the Taff Vale Railway commissioned the German locomotive factory Hannoversche Maschinenbau AG to build six locomotives in 1914. However, due to the outbreak of the First World War, the deal did not come into being. The order for these six locomotives was transferred to North British and they were delivered as nos. 42 etc. during 1915.

See also
 Welsh 0-6-2T locomotives
 Locomotives of the Great Western Railway

References

Sources

External links
 Rail UK database entry for Taff Vale Railway A class
 Builder's photo of 123 (ETH Zurich)

A
0-6-2T locomotives
Hawthorn Leslie and Company locomotives
Nasmyth, Wilson and Company locomotives
NBL locomotives
Vulcan Foundry locomotives
Railway locomotives introduced in 1914
Standard gauge steam locomotives of Great Britain
Scrapped locomotives

Passenger locomotives